Nordic Woman is a compilation album that features traditional music forms performed by well known female artists in Nordic countries.

Nordic Woman album was released worldwide in 2012.
The album is the first release from WOMAN which is an album series created and produced by Norwegian composer and producer Deeyah Khan to spotlight women's voices and the indigenous and traditional music from different parts of the world.

Each album in the WOMAN series is created to draw attention to women's position within various societies today highlighting the accomplishments as well as remaining struggles and barriers women face.

Track listing

References

2012 compilation albums